Demetrius Charles McCray (born May 11, 1991) is a former American football cornerback. He was drafted by the Jacksonville Jaguars in the seventh round of the 2013 NFL Draft. McCray was also a member of the Seattle Seahawks and Oakland Raiders. He attended Newton High School  in Covington, Georgia, where he lettered in football, basketball and track. Later, he played college football for Appalachian State.

Professional career

Jacksonville Jaguars
McCray was drafted by the Jaguars in the seventh round, 210th overall, in the 2013 NFL Draft. In three seasons with Jacksonville, McCray played in 46 games with 16 starts recording 86 tackles and six passes defensed.

On August 29, 2016, McCray was released by the Jaguars.

Seattle Seahawks
On January 19, 2017, McCray signed a reserve/future contract with the Seahawks. He was waived on September 2, 2017.

Oakland Raiders
On October 10, 2017, McCray signed with the Oakland Raiders. He was waived/injured by the Raiders on November 4, 2017, and placed on injured reserve. He was released with an injury settlement on November 9, 2017.

References

External links
Jacksonville Jaguars bio
Appalachian State Mountaineers bio

1991 births
Living people
People from Covington, Georgia
Sportspeople from the Atlanta metropolitan area
Players of American football from Georgia (U.S. state)
American football cornerbacks
Appalachian State Mountaineers football players
Jacksonville Jaguars players
Seattle Seahawks players
Oakland Raiders players